The Inmate (Spanish: El Recluso) is an American television series produced by Telemundo Internacional Studios that premiered on Telemundo on 25 September 2018 and concluded on 11 October 2018. It is an adaptation of the Argentine television series titled El Marginal created by Sebastián Ortega and Adrián Caetano. The series tells the story of an ex-marine who enters a maximum security prison on the border between Mexico and the United States to investigate the kidnapping of the daughter of a prominent US judge.

Plot 
An American ex-marine, Lázaro Mendoza (Ignacio Serricchio) enters a maximum security prison in Mexico (La Rotunda), under a false identity and accused of an alleged triple homicide. Now as Dante Pardo, his mission is to infiltrate a dangerous gang of prisoners and guards that operates inside and outside the prison. They are the main suspects in the kidnapping of the teenage daughter of an American judge named John Morris (Guy Ecker). Within La Rotunda, Lázaro has to discover who is the mastermind of the kidnapping and discover the whereabouts of the girl.

Cast 
Confirmed cast.
 Ignacio Serricchio as Lázaro Mendoza / Dante Pardo
 Ana Claudia Talancón as Frida Villarreal
 Flavio Medina as Jorge Peniche
 Luis Felipe Tovar as Mariano Tavares
 David Chocarro as Juan Pablo 'Santito'
 Mariana Seoane as Roxana Castañeda
 Guy Ecker as John Morris
 Isabella Castillo as Linda Morris
 Bradley Stryker as Jack
 Gustavo Sánchez Parra as Cuauhtémoc
 Leonardo Ortizgris as Florentino
 Alejandro Calva as La Foca
 Rodrigo Oviedo as Silvestre Chávez
 Ramón Medina as Marcial Navarro
 Erik Hayser as Jeremy Jones
 Diego Calva as El Rubio
 Kristyan Ferrer as El Syka
 Juan Pablo Castañeda as El Picudo
 Héctor Suárez as Salvador Valencia 'El Procurador'
 Amador Torralba as Balin
 Armando Espitia as Bocinas
 Hector Kotsifakis as El Muerto
 Luis Daniel Muñoz as Cumbias
 Ricardo Esquerra as El Sobaco
 Moisés Arizmendi as Porfirio Mendoza
 Pepe Alonso as El Elegante
 Tiaré Scanda as Azucena Tavares
 Adriana Barraza as Guadalupe Mendoza
 Jolien Rutgers as Camila
 Vanesa Restrepo as Elvira
 Nacho Tahhan as Evaristo Galindo
 Cesar Ramos as Julian Mora

Production 
The series was unveiled by Telemundo at NAPTE 2018. Filming took place in Mexico during 2017. The first season will consist of 13 episodes.

Ratings 
 
}}

Episodes

Awards and nominations

References

External links 
 

2018 American television series debuts
2018 American television series endings
2010s American drama television series
Telemundo original programming
Spanish-language Netflix original programming